The 2nd Standing Committee of the Supreme People's Assembly (SPA) was elected by the 1st Session of the 2nd Supreme People's Assembly on 20 September 1957. It was replaced on 23 October 1962 by the 3rd SPA Standing Committee.

Members

1st Session (1957–58)

4th Session (1958–59)

6th Session (1959–61)

9th Session (1961–62)

References

Citations

Bibliography
Books:
 

2nd Supreme People's Assembly
Presidium of the Supreme People's Assembly
1957 establishments in North Korea
1962 disestablishments in North Korea